Oncol Park (Spanish: Parque Oncol) is a natural reserve located  from the city of Valdivia, Chile. From the peak of Cerro Oncol it is possible to see Llaima Volcano, Villarrica Volcano and even Mount Tronador on the international border of Chile and Argentina. The park is property of the wood pulp enterprise Celulosa Arauco y Constitución.

See also
Área Costera Protegida Punta Curiñanco
Carlos Anwandter Nature Sanctuary
El Bosque Urban Park

References
 Website about Oncol Park

External links

Protected areas of Los Ríos Region
Celulosa Arauco y Constitución
Valdivian temperate rainforest